Rodovia Washington Luís (official designation SP-310) is a highway in the state of São Paulo, Brazil.

It runs in the North-Northwest direction, departing as a branch from the Anhangüera Highway near the city of Limeira. It also crosses with the Rodovia dos Bandeirantes, nearby the city of Cordeirópolis.

Main cities linked by the Washington Luís Highway are Rio Claro, São Carlos, Araraquara, Matão, Catanduva, São José do Rio Preto and Mirassol.

It is named in honor of Washington Luís (1869–1957), one of the presidents of Brazil and a paulista, who famously declared in 1926 that "to govern is to build roads".

The highway is managed and maintained through a state concession to the private companies Centrovias and Triângulo do Sol, and therefore is a toll road.

From Mirassol to Ilha Solteira, the name is changed to "Feliciano Sales Cunha", keeping the SP-310 code.

There is another highway so named in Brazil, in the state of Rio de Janeiro, between Rio de Janeiro and Petrópolis.

Highway description

 km 153 - The highway start at Rodovia Anhangüera
 km 153 - The start of administration Centrovias
 km 155 - Weighing scale (north and south way)
 km 156 - Exit to Rodovia dos Bandeirantes
 km 159 - Exit to Cordeirópolis
 km 161 - Speedtrap (north way)
 km 165 - Exit to Santa Gertrudes
 km 173 - Highway Police
 km 173 - Exit to Rio Claro
 km 173 - Exit to Piracicaba (36 km)
 km 173,840 - Speedtrap (north way)
 km 175,345 - Speedtrap (south way)
 km 180 - Exit to São Pedro (51 km)
 km 181 - Toll road Rio Claro (south way)
 km 182 - Speedtrap (south way)
 km 184,396 - Speedtrap (south way)
 km 184,400 - SAU (south way) Rio Claro
 km 194,600 - Speedtrap (south way)
 km 198 - Highway Police
 km 199 - Exit to Corumbataí
 km 199,900 - Speedtrap (south way)
 km 200,150 - Weighing scale
 km 200,150 - SAU (north way) Corumbataí
 km 201,200 - Weighing scale (south way)
 km 205,850 - Speedtrap (north way)
 km 207 - Exit to (SP-225) by Analândia (16 km), Pirassununga (41 km)
 km 207 - Exit to (SP-225) by Itirapina, Represa do Broa, Brotas (34 km), Jaú (85 km) and Bauru
 km 209 - Weighing scale (north way)
 km 214,100 - Weighing scale (south way)
 km 217 - Toll road Itirapina / São Carlos (north way)
 km 217,080 - SAU (south way) Itirapina
 km 220 - Northbound - Graal Rubi Road Services
 km 222 - Southbound - Castelo Road Services Plaza
 km 222 - Southbound - Hotel Pousadas Conde do Pinhal
 km 225,060 - Speedtrap (north way)
 km 227,800 - The end of administration Centrovias
 km 227,800 - The start of administration Triângulo do Sol
 km 227,900 - Exit to São Carlos by (SP-215)
 km 227.900 - Exit to Volkswagen engines
 km 227,900 - Exit to (SP-215) by Ribeirão Bonito (33 km), Dourado, São Paulo (50 km), Jaú (85 km) and Bauru
 km 227,900 - Exit to (SP-215) by Descalvado (35 km) and Porto Ferreira (48 km)
 km 228,600 - Exit to São Carlos (Getúlio Vargas avenue)
 km 231 - Exit to São Carlos
 km 231 - Exit to FADISC
 km 231 - Exit to Jardim Tangará and others
 km 231,750 - Exit to São Carlos
 km 231,750 - Exit to Jardim Maria Stella Fagá and others
 km 231,750 - Exit to Estrada da Babilônia (SCA-334)
 km 232 - Exit to São Carlos
 km 232 - Exit to Vila Santa Maria I, II and São Carlos VIII
 km 232 - Exit to São Carlos (Vila Nery)
 km 233,700 - Highway Police
 km 234 - Exit to São Carlos (Araraquara avenue)
 km 234,200 - Footbridge
 km 235 - Exit to UFSCar
 km 235 - Exit to São Carlos
 km 235,500 - Speedtrap (north way)
 km 235,400 - Exit to (SP-318) São Carlos Airport, TAM Museum and Technology Center of TAM (14 km)
 km 235,400 - Exit to (SP-318) Damha Golf Club (2 km) and Ribeirão Preto (91 km)
 km 235,800 - Exit to São Carlos (Luís Augusto de Oliveira avenue)
 km 236,300 - Southbound - Esplanada Road Services 
 km 236,500 - Exit to Tecumseh do Brasil
 km 236,500 - Exit to São Carlos
 km 236,750 - Footbridge
 km 238 - Southbound - Graal São Carlos Road Services
 km 240 - Exit to São Carlos
 km 240 - Exit to UNICEP, USP II and Makro
 km 247 - Exit to Ibaté
 km 253,100 - SAU (north way) Ibaté
 km 260,150 - Speedtrap (south way)
 km 268 - Exit to Araraquara
 km 268 - Exit to Ribeirão Preto (83 km)
 km 268 - Exit to Jaú (66 km), and Barra Bonita (86 km)
 km 271,300 - Speedtrap (north way)
 km 273 - Highway Police
 km 273,900 - Exit to Araraquara
 km 282 - Toll road Araraquara
 km 282,400 - SAU (south way) Araraquara
 km 287 - Exit to Ibitinga
 km 291 - Break area (north way)
 km 291,800 - Speedtrap (north way)
 km 292 - Exit to Rodovia Brigadeiro Faria Lima (SP-326) for Matão, Bebedouro (83 km), and Barretos (130 km)
 km 301 - Exit to Matão
 km 315 - Exit to Jaboticabal (41 km)
 km 325 - SAU (north way) Taquaritinga
 km 329 - Exit to Taquaritinga (SP-333)
 km 330 - Exit to Itápolis (24 km), Borborema (50 km)
 km 341 - Exit to Cândido Rodrigues (11 km)
 km 348 - Toll road
 km 351 - Exit to Agulha and Botelho
 km 353 - Exit to Uraí
 km 364 - Exit to Santa Adélia
 km 376 - Exit to Pindorama and Roberto (8 km)
 km 382 - Highway Police
 km 382 - Exit to Catanduva
 km 382 - Exit to Novo Horizonte (50 km)
 km 384 - Exit to Bebedouro (73 km) and Urupês (32 km)
 km 384 - SAU (south way) Catanduva
 km 394 - Exit to Catiguá and Olímpia (43 km)
 km 394,900 - Speedtrap (north way)
 km 398 - Toll road
 km 398,500 - SAU (north way) Catiguá
 km 402 - Exit to Ibirá
 km 412 - Exit to Uchoa
 km 425 - Highway Police
 km 425 - Exit to Cedral and Potirendaba (17 km)
 km 430 - Exit to Engenheiro Schmidt
 km 436 - Exit to Barretos (98 km) and Lins (118 km)
 km 437 - Speedtrap (south way)
 km 439 - Exit to São José do Rio Preto and Ilha Solteira (227 km)
 km 443 - SAU (south way) São José do Rio Preto
 km 444 - Footbridge
 km 444,400 - Speedtrap (south way)
 km 452 - Speedtrap (north way)
 km 454,300 - The end of administration Triângulo do Sol

See also
 Highway system of São Paulo
 Brazilian Highway System

External links
  Centrovias Sistems Highway
  Triângulo do Sol Highway

Highways in São Paulo (state)
São Carlos